Kakumia ideoides is a butterfly in the family Lycaenidae. It is found in Gabon, the Republic of the Congo, the Democratic Republic of the Congo (Uele, Tshopo, Sankuru and Lualaba), Uganda and western Tanzania. The habitat consists of forests at altitudes between 900 and 1,400 metres.

References

External links

Die Gross-Schmetterlinge der Erde 13: Die Afrikanischen Tagfalter. Plate XIII 65 b

Butterflies described in 1887
Poritiinae
Butterflies of Africa
Taxa named by Hermann Dewitz